Amy Davidson may refer to:

Amy Davidson, US actress (born 1979)
Amy Davidson Sorkin, US author, senior editor at The New Yorker magazine
Amy Davidson (basketballer) from Minnesota Miss Basketball
Amy Davidson (journalist) from Guantanamo Bay detainment camp library